Three-time defending champions Alfie Hewett and Gordon Reid defeated Maikel Scheffers and Ruben Spaargaren in the final, 6–1, 6–2 to win the men's doubles wheelchair tennis title at the 2023 Australian Open.

Seeds

Draw

Finals

References

External links 
 Draw

Wheelchair men's doubles
Australian Open, 2023 men's doubles